The 2013 Asian Le Mans Series was the second season of the Automobile Club de l'Ouest's Asian Le Mans Series endurance auto racing championship. The series was initially launched in 2009 at the 1000 km of Okayama, but did not resume the following year. The project was reinitialized by the Automobile Club de l'Ouest (ACO) in 2012, with the Chinese S2M Group serving as the series promoter and TS Motorsport serving as organizer. It is the fourth 24 Hours of Le Mans-based series created by the ACO, following the American Le Mans Series, European Le Mans Series, and FIA World Endurance Championship. The four event season began in Inje, South Korea on 4 August and ended in Selangor, Malaysia on 8 December 2013.

Regulations
The Asian Le Mans Series follows much of the format utilized by the American and European Le Mans Series. Four categories of cars are eligible for the series: Le Mans Prototype 2 (LMP2), Le Mans Prototype Challenge (LMPC), GT Challenge (GTC), and GT Challenge Amateur (GTC Am). The GTC category is open to FIA GT3 category cars, cars from one-make series, and unique to the Asian series, JAF-GT, a road-derived variant car taking part in the GT300 category of the Japanese Super GT series. All four categories require at least one amateur driver and one professional driver in each car, although teams are allowed a maximum of three drivers per car. In order to boost Asian participation in the series, all cars must also have at least one driver of Asian nationality. An LMGTE category, identical to that used at Le Mans, was considered but later dropped for the 2013 season. For the 3 Hours of Fuji, an SGT class is added into the race, which is an optional point-scoring round of the GT300 class of the 2013 Super GT season. Entrants must keep their original driver lineup in order to be eligible for the race.

The team champions in the LMP2 will each automatic invitations in their category to the 2014 24 Hours of Le Mans, while the top two GTC class teams will earn invitations in the LMGTE Amateur category at Le Mans.

Calendar
An initial six race 2013 calendar was revealed during the 2012 6 Hours of Shanghai, although several circuits had previously announced contracts with the series. The first half of the season was exclusively in China, with the Zhuhai International Circuit, Shanghai International Circuit, and Ordos International Circuit playing host. Following an agreement between the teams and organisers to delay and compress the 2013 season, the Shanghai and Ordos rounds were cancelled, and the season now begins in South Korea at the new Inje Speedium which was completed early in 2013. Fuji Speedway in Japan hosts the second round a month before the 6 Hours of Fuji World Endurance Championship event. Zhuhai, the sole remaining Chinese round, is moved back to October for the third race of the year. The Sepang International Circuit in Malaysia will serve as the finale for the season, replacing the initially scheduled Sentul International Circuit of Indonesia.

All events on the calendar will have practice sessions held on Friday, qualifying on Saturday, and the three-hour race on Sunday. Unlike the American and European Le Mans Series, the Asian Le Mans Series will not share any race weekends with the FIA World Endurance Championship.

Teams and Drivers

LMP2
All entries use Michelin tyres.

LMGTE
All entries use Michelin tyres.

GTC
All entries use Michelin tyres.

GTC Am
All entries use Michelin tyres.

SGT

Season results

Championship Standings

Scoring system

Teams Championships
The winners of the LMP2 championship and the top two finishers in the GTC championship earn automatic entry to the 2014 24 Hours of Le Mans.

LMP2 Standings

GTE Standings

GTC Standings

Drivers Championships

LMP2 Standings

GTE Standings

GTC Standings

References

External links
 

 
Asian Le Mans Series
Le Mans Series